Friendship House (also known as The Maples, Maple Square, or Duncanson House) is a Georgian townhouse, located at 619 D Street, (630 South Carolina Avenue), Southeast, Washington, D.C., in the Capitol Hill neighborhood.

History
]
It was designed by William Lovering in 1795.

The first owner of the home was William Mayne Duncanson, whose house guests included George Washington. 
In August 1814, it served as a hospital after the Battle of Bladensburg.
In 1815, it was purchased from bankruptcy, by Francis Scott Key.
In July 1838, it was purchased by Major Augustus A. Nicholson.
On June 2, 1856, it was purchased by John M. Clayton. He added a ballroom with decoration by Constantino Brumidi.
On April 20, 1858, it was purchased by Louis François de Pourtalès; there are rumors of his winecellar.
In 1871, it was purchased by journalist Mrs. Emily Edson Briggs; she named it "Maple Square."

The Friendship House Association, founded in 1904, purchased the house in 1936, and operated a settlement house, and community center there.
As the Capitol Hill neighborhood gentrified, most of the people served were in other parts of Washington, D.C.

It was placed on the National Register of Historic Places on January 18, 1973.
The property was sold in 2010, to a private developer.

See also
 National Register of Historic Places listings in the District of Columbia
 Friendship House

References

External links 
http://wikimapia.org/1412760/Friendship-House

Houses on the National Register of Historic Places in Washington, D.C.
Georgian architecture in Washington, D.C.
Houses completed in 1795
Individually listed contributing properties to historic districts on the National Register in Washington, D.C.